Laurynas is a Lithuanian masculine given name and may refer to:

Laurynas Beliauskas (born 1997), Lithuanian basketball player
Laurynas Birutis (born 1997), Lithuanian basketball player
Laurynas Gucevičius (1753–1798), Polish-Lithuanian architect 
Laurynas Grigelis (born  1991), Lithuanian tennis player 
Laurynas Mikalauskas (born 1985), Lithuanian basketball player
Laurynas Samėnas (born 1988), Lithuanian basketball player 
Laurynas Stankevičius (born 1935), Lithuanian politician; Prime Minister of Lithuania
Laurynas Ivinskis (1810–1881), Lithuanian  publisher, translator, teacher, and lexicographer
Laurynas Rimavičius (born 1985), Lithuanian football defender

Lithuanian masculine given names